The BLH RF-16 is a  cab unit-type diesel locomotive built for freight service by the Baldwin-Lima-Hamilton Corporation between 1950 and 1953.  All RF-16s were configured with a B-B wheel arrangement and ran on two AAR Type B two-axle road trucks, with all axles powered.  A total of 109 cab-equipped A units were built, along with 51 cabless booster B units, for a total of 160 locomotives built. As was the case with most passenger locomotives of its day, the RF-16s came equipped with a retractable, nose-mounted drop coupler pilot.  Unlike competing units from EMD and Alco, the RF-16 used an air-powered throttle, meaning that it could not be run in MU operation with EMD or Alco diesels without special MU equipment.

History 
In 1948, Baldwin began to apply a new "Sharknose" body style to its cab unit diesel locomotives.  The goal of the new style was partly to differentiate Baldwin locomotives from competitors, and partly to distance the new locomotives from early Baldwin diesels that were plagued with mechanical problems.  The style was inspired by the Pennsylvania Railroad's T1 class duplex steam locomotive, some of which were built by Baldwin.  The first locomotives to receive the new styling was the DR-6-4-2000. When the RF-16 (essentially a "debugged" DR-4-4-1500 freight locomotive with a new prime mover) was introduced in 1950, it was given the new "Sharknose" styling.

The RF-16 quickly gained a reputation as a reliable and rugged locomotive with tough "lugging power."  Many of the units saw service hauling coal drags, where these characteristics were put to best use.  A pair of Pennsylvania Railroad RF-16s were repowered with ALCO prime movers in December 1959, with mixed results. The Baltimore and Ohio retired its Sharknoses as a class in 1962. In 1966, the Pennsylvania Railroad, the largest single owner of RF-16s, ceased use of the distinctive locomotives.  

In 1967, the Monongahela Railway purchased seven A-units and two cabless B-units, the last remaining units from the New York Central Sharknose fleet.

Delaware and Hudson 1205 and 1216
By August 1974, all but two of the Monongahela Railway units, what were to become 1205 and 1216, had been sold for scrap. The final pair were to be scrapped by GE, but were saved when the Delaware and Hudson Railroad purchased both units from the scrap dealer in exchange for an equal value of scrap steel. They were used in freight service and in passenger excursion service on the D&H until April 1978.

In April they were purchased by Castolite Corporation, a locomotive leasing firm. The pair was leased for use on the Michigan Northern Railway in 1979 before being moved to the Escanaba and Lake Superior Railroad (ELS). The E&LS used #1216 for a short time in mid-1979, and a photo exists of it operating near Turner, Michigan. It was used in freight service again in the fall of 1982, but its crankshaft broke not long after. Both #1216 and #1205 have been stored since that time on E&LS property in Escanaba and Wells, Michigan, inaccessible to the public.

On January 10, 2020, Trains Magazine reported that the two surviving units will be going to a museum for preservation, but subsequent 2021 reporting revealed that a full restoration was economically unfeasible at that time.

On December 2, 2021, the E&LS 1216 was moved from storage in Escanaba, Michigan to a shop at the railroad's headquarters in Wells, Michigan to free up space for freight car cleaning at the Escanaba car shop.

Original buyers

See also
  Delaware and Hudson 1205 and 1216
 A History of the Michigan Northern and the Last Two Remaining Sharks by Alex Huff
 Who owned/operated Sharks (Baldwin RF-16)?

References

External links 
 Preserved Baldwin Box and Cab Units
 PRR Diesel Locomotive diagrams: Baldwin RF16 "A" (freight shark)
 PRR Diesel Locomotive diagrams: Baldwin RF16 "B" (freight shark)
 Riding the D&H Sharks article by Jay Winn at The Bridgeline Historical Society official website.
 D&H 1205 Delaware & Hudson RF-16's at Wells, Michigan. Photo by NS4Ever in July, 1982

Diesel-electric locomotives of the United States
B-B locomotives
RF-16
Railway locomotives introduced in 1950
Locomotives with cabless variants
Freight locomotives
Standard gauge locomotives of the United States
Streamlined diesel locomotives